Panagiotis "Takis" Roumeliotis (Greek: Παναγιώτης Ρουμελιώτης, born August 19, 1947), is a Greek economist, academic, banker and politician. A friend and advisor of Andreas Papandreou, he has served as Minister of National Economy, Minister of Commerce, Member of the European Parliament for PASOK and as Greece's representative at the International Monetary Fund. Since December 2011, he has been Vice Chairman of Piraeus Bank, Greece's largest.

Biography
He was born in 1947 in Suez, Egypt, the son of a Greek businessman established there. He graduated with a degree in economics from the French School for Advanced Studies in the Social Sciences (École des hautes études en sciences sociales), and later received a PhD in economics from Pantheon-Sorbonne University, also in France.

He has taught economics at various universities in France and Greece. He has also been president of the French think tank IPEMED (Institut de prospective économique du monde méditerranéen).

His political career began in 1978, when he became an economic advisor to Andreas Papandreou. After Papandreou became Greece's Prime Minister in 1981, Roumeliotis served, successively, as:

October - December 1981: General Secretary of the Ministry of Coordination
December 1981 - July 1982: Deputy Minister of Coordination
July 1982 - September 1983: Deputy Minister of Finance
April 1984 - February 1987: Deputy Minister of National Economy
February - November 1987: Minister of Commerce
November 1987 - July 1989: Minister of National Economy

From 1989 until 1994 he was Member of the European Parliament for PASOK.

Throughout the 1990s and 2000s he held various positions, such as Special Representative of the Council of the European Union for the stability process in the Balkans (1997-2000) and President of the Working Group for democratization, human rights and minority rights of the South Eastern Europe Stability Pact (2000-2001).

From March 2010 until December 2011, he was Greece's representative at the International Monetary Fund (IMF).

In December 2011, he became Vice Chairman of Piraeus Bank, Greece's largest. The Chairman of the Bank, Michalis Sallas, was also an economic advisor for Andreas Papandreou, and he and Roumeliotis have known each other for many years.

In 2015, he criticised the IMF of using seminars to misinform Greek journalists.

References

1947 births
20th-century Greek economists
Living people
Economy ministers of Greece
MEPs for Greece 1989–1994
PASOK politicians
PASOK MEPs
People from Suez
21st-century Greek economists